Gotjawal Forest is a naturally formed forest located on the middle slopes of Halla Mountain, Jeju Island in South Korea. It covers the rocky area of aā on Jeju Island off the southwestern coast of South Korea. Due to the geographical feature, the region remains largely undisturbed by people. The Gotjawal Forest is an enclave of the Southern Korea evergreen forests ecoregion, and is a favorite place of the Jeju locals.

Etymology
Traditionally, Jeju locals call any forest on rocky ground "Gotjawal" (곶자왈). According to the Jeju Dialect Dictionary, "Gotjawal" refers to an unmanned and unapproachable forest mixed with trees and bushes. However, Song Shi-tae suggested, in his Ph.D. dissertation, a new meaning for the term "Gotjawal" because of its direct association with "Aā. Therefore, using the term "Gotjawal Lava" instead of "Aā" can be useful in land and groundwater management. Some people insist that the meaning of Gotjawal should not be restricted to geological features according to Jeong Gwang-jung's 2004 study. They say the ecological, historical, and cultural context should also be considered. However, it is still not clear how they define the meaning of Gotjawal.

In his 2003 study, Song asserted that protecting the Gotjawal area on Jeju is essential to protecting the island's groundwater, because rain water penetrates directly into the groundwater aquifer through cracks in the region's rocky earth.

Features
The Gotjawal forest is considered to have three important features such as "its formation in rocky areas", "plants specific to this ecosystem", and "rain water penetrating to the groundwater aquifer".

Rocky areas

The Gotjawal forest is formed on rocky areas. As it was difficult to develop these areas for agriculture, the forest remained untouched even in the twentieth century. In his 2000 study, Song Shi-tae insisted that Gotjawal's terrain is mainly on aā lava. Based on his field research, the Distribution Map of Gotjawal Terrain on Jeju-do was drawn. However, further research revealed that the terrain is not pure aā lava but rather a mixture of aā lava, and Pahoehoe lava, which Dr. Song also suggested naming Bille lava, following the dialect term of local people.

While Gotjawal forest includes pahoehoe lava, in some areas, it is true that Gotjawal Forest is overwhelmingly a rocky area which is difficult to cultivate. Therefore, the most practical definition of the Gotjawal Forest is: "a forest on Jeju Island, on land difficult to cultivate because it is a rocky area."

Endangered plant and animal species habitat

The Gotjawal forest is a sub-region of the Southern Korea evergreen forests ecoregion, and they are within the temperate broadleaf and mixed forest biome. The Korean Ministry of Environment has found a variety of endemic plant and animal species in its habitats, with some being threatened and endangered species. Five unrecorded species of plankton were found during their investigation in 2005 in the Dong Baek Dong San area of Gotjawal forest.

An area called Dong Baek Dong San (meaning 'Camelia Forest', 590,083 sq. meters) in Gotjawal forest, located at San 12, Seonheul-ri, Jocheon-eup, Jeju City, Jeju Province, is the only known natural habitat of Mankyua chejuense, a recently discovered genus. This is according to Ms. Yim Eun Young's thesis. She also found many other species of bryophyte during her investigation. She concluded that the Dong Baek Dong San region in Gotjawal forest is an important area for bryophyte research.

The other parts of Jeju's Gotjawal forest have not yet been thoroughly investigated yet.

Rain water penetrating to the groundwater aquifer

46% of all rainwater falling on Jeju Island in the Gotjawal forest's areas permeates through the lava and soil into the groundwater's aquifers, via lava structures such as lava tubes, skylights, clinkers, and cracks; structures typically found in Aā lava. This is the highest rainwater percolation and groundwater recharge rate in South Korea.

The Gotjawal forest's canopies diffusing raindrops and surface plant litter reducing runoff and increasing initial absorption contribute to the high groundwater absorption rate of rainwater. There are few rivers on the forested west or east of the island because almost all the rainwater is drawn directly into the groundwater. By comparison the north and south of Jeju Island has many small rivers.

Distribution of Gotjawal Forest
According to Song, there are four main Gotjawal terrains covering , about 12%, of Jeju-do island's. The Gotjawal terrain is located on the west and east of the island, where the lava flowed more slowly than the steeper north and south sides. A map showing the distribution of Gotjawal Forest on Jeju-do Island, is included in Song's paper.

Protection and development

As is seen from the three features of Gotjawal forest, it was difficult to develop this forest before modern era, as it is formed on quite rocky areas. That's why Gotjawal forest could maintain its original ecosystem generally unaffected by human activity.

New developments
However beginning in the 1980s, interest grew to develop within the forest to build golf courses, resorts, and other tourist facilities. The use contemporary construction technology allows unprecedented changes to the native habitat landscapes and hydrology. Meanwhile, developing new tourist attractions is important for the island's economy, which depends on the tourist industry.

Golf courses and aquifers
However, some parts of Gotjawal forest have already been developed. Some parts of the forest are now golf courses. By the end of 2005, there were already more than 16 golf courses on Jeju, and many golf courses are either under construction or in the planning stages. In addition, a location set for a famous TV drama, The Legend, was established on a part of the forest. Other tourist sites are also being planned in or near Gotjawal forest.

How much groundwater is used by golf courses and whether the present use of groundwater is sustainable is the subject of many hot debates. In data from 2002, we find documentation that water used for domestic purposes per day in Jeju is 634,864m3/day, (43%), while water used for agricultural purposes per day is 800,565m3/day (54%). These researchers referred to the report issued by KOWACO. Water used by 16 golf courses during 2004 was 39,303 ton per day. Environmental organizations say that golf courses are the main cause of groundwater exhaustion and pollution, but we do not yet know whether this is true or not.

New protections
Citizens
With such threats to the ecology, a citizens' movement to protect Gotjawal forest arose on Jeju-do. "Gotjawal People " is solely dedicated to the protection of Gotjawal forest. Half-million citizens of Jeju-do not only focus on the forest plants, but also on its critically important function of recharging and cleaning groundwater supply. People are aware that protecting Gotjawal forest is essential to the protection of groundwater, which is under threat from overuse for the agriculture and golf industries.

Protecting Gotjawal forest contributes to protecting groundwater in two ways: (1) Gotjawal forest is an important groundwater recharging area. So, by protecting the forest, the groundwater can be recharged. (2) Golf courses use huge amounts of groundwater.

Government
The Jeju's Provincial Government designated a part of Gotjawal (Dong Baek Dong San, Camellia Forest) as a Local Natural Monument in 1981. But the government has not paid much attention or budgeted necessary funds for research and education projects for Dong Baek Dong San forest.

The  Jeju's Provincial Government, in addition, established the "Gotjawal Trust " in 2007, stated as dedicated to the preservation and protection of the Gotjawal forest. Nonetheless the government has been criticized for allowing the construction of golf courses and other tourist facilities within the forest habitats that are rapidly destroying portions of the Gotjawal forest and reducing aquifer recharging.

Ramsar Convention Wetlands

Gotjawal Forest qualifies as Internationally Important Wetlands as designated by the Ramsar Convention on Wetlands. Gotjawal forest falls into the Ramsar wetland type of Zk(b) karst and other subterranean hydrological systems.  However to date, Gotjawal Forest has not been declared a Ramsar site.

Scope
Ramsar Convention guidelines say that, "Regardless of genesis, these terms (karst and other subterranean hydrological systems) should be used to include all subterranean cavities and voids with water. Such sites would be eligible for inclusion in the Ramsar List whenever the site selection Criteria are fulfilled." This guideline further clarifies the definition of "Wetlands" by saying that "The Ramsar definition of wetlands (Article 1.1) should be read/understood to include surface and subterranean wetlands, although the Convention text does not explicitly refer to these systems.

Criteria
When considering the essential function of Gotjawal forest in recharging and protecting groundwater – and the sole source of water for 500,000 people on Jeju – Gotjawal forest qualifies as Internationally Important Wetland according to the Ramsar Convention. In addition, Gotjawal forest qualifies as a Ramsar Site because of its unique forest ecology.

The Ramsar Convention requires that a wetland meet just ONE of the criteria suggested by the Convention in order to be considered an Internationally Important Wetland. According to the above-mentioned guidelines, Gotjawal forest qualifies on the basis of ALL of the following criteria.

Criterion 1:  A wetland should be considered internationally important if it contains a representative, rare, or unique example of a natural or near-natural wetland type found within the appropriate biogeographic region. (About Criterion 1, the Convention further explains:
Criterion 2: A wetland should be considered internationally important if it supports vulnerable, endangered, or critically endangered species or threatened ecological communities.

Hydrological importance. As indicated by Article 2 of the Ramsar Convention, wetlands can be selected for their hydrological importance which, inter alia, may include the following attributes. They may: i) play a major role in the natural control, amelioration or prevention of flooding; ii) be important for seasonal water retention for wetlands or other areas of conservation importance downstream; iii) be important for the recharge of aquifer; iv) form part of karst or underground hydrological or spring systems that supply major surface wetlands;

Gotjawal forest in Jeju-do qualifies criterion because:
 It is an important area of groundwater recharge, as is explained by paragraph "Features of Gotjawal forest" of this article. 
 It qualifies the criterion 2, because it provides habitat for endangered species of fern, as is explained in paragraph 2 of this article. # In addition, Gotjawal forest is also a regular breeding site for endangered bird species, including the fairy pitta, Pitta brachyura nympha, and Japanese paradise flycatcher, Terpsiphone atrocaudata.

See also
Forest ecology
Temperate broadleaf and mixed forest - biome
Ramsar Classification System for Wetland Types
Wetland classification

Footnotes

References 

Han, Sang-cheol, 2002,  Study on the grouting method of construction of Jeju island groundwater, Cheju National University.
Jang, Yong-chang and Chanwon Lee, 2009, Gotjawal Forest as an internationally important Wetlant, Journal of Korean Wetlands Studies, Vol 11-1, April 2009, pp. 99–104
Jeju Provincial Government, 1995,  Jeju Dialect Dictionary (濟州語 辭典)
Jeong, Gwang-jung, 2004, Gotjawal and the livelihood of Jeju's People, 2004, Jeju Educational College, V. 33, pp. 41~65.
Kim, Jeong-hee, 2006, Impact Study of golf course construction planning on the groundwater sustainable yield in Jeju Island, Seoul National University, M.A. thesis.
Kim, Eun-mi, 2003,  Habitat Environment of Fairy Pitta (Pitta nympha Temminck & Schlegel) on Jeju Island, Korea, Jeju National University, M.A. thesis.
Ko, Kiwon, 1997,  Characteristics of Groundwater Existence on Jeju Island and its hydro-geological relationship with Seogwipo layer, Pusan University, Ph.D dissertation.
KOWACO(Korea Water Resources Corporation ), 2003, Comprehensive Research Report on the Hydrology and Groundwater of Jeju Island.
Oh, Hong-shik, Byung-soo Kim, and Wanbyung Kim, 2002, Study on the bird communities of Mt. Halla, Korea Journal of Ornithology, Vol 9, No. 2, pp85–104
Ramsar Convention, 1987,The Convention on Wetlands text , as amended in 1982 and 1987
Ramsar Convention, 2009 A, Strategic Framework for the List of Wetlands of International Importance, edition 2009
Ramsar Convention, 2009 B, Strategic Framework for the List of Wetlands of International Importance, edition 2009, Annex B: Ramsar Classification System for Wetland Type
Ramsar Convention, 2009 C, Strategic Framework for the List of Wetlands of International Importance, edition 2009, Annex C: Criteria for Identifying Wetlands of International Importance
Song, Shi-tae, 2000, Distributions and Lithology of the Aa Rubble Flows in Cheju Island, Korea, Pusan University, Ph.D. Dissertation.
Song, Shi-tae, 2003, Lavas in Gotjawal Terrain, Jeju Island, Korea No.3, Doneori Gotjawal Lava, Journal of Basic Science, Jeju National University, V16(1), pp. 47~55.
Song, Shi-tae, Kiwon Ko, and Sun Yoon, 1996, A survey on Gotjawal and Lava tube affecting groundwater recharge and pollution in Jeju, Korea Groundwater and Environment, pp. 68–69
Yim, Eun-young, 2007, Bryophyte Flora of Dongbaek-dongsan, Jeju-do, Cheju National University, M.A. thesis.
Yun Beomseop, Sangeun Lee, Donghoon Cha, and Heekyung Park, 2006, Analyzing the Groundwater Use Sustainability of Small Islands Using System Dynamics: Jeju Island Case Study

External links
Gotjawal People, NGO dedicated to protection of Gotjawal Forest
Jeju Gotjawal , an English webpage providing information on the ecology of Gotjawal Forest.
Jeju Olle , - a trail route through Gotjawal forest for ecological tourism
Gotjawal Trust, NGO supported by Jeju Provincial Government

Tourist attractions in Jeju Province
Forests of South Korea
Wetlands of South Korea
Environment of South Korea
Temperate broadleaf and mixed forests
Ecoregions of Asia
Geography of Jeju Province